Gabriel Thomas Dadour AM (19 April 1925 – 17 March 2011) was an Australian doctor and politician who was a member of the Legislative Assembly of Western Australia from 1971 to 1986, representing the seat of Subiaco. He was a member of the Liberal Party until 1984, when he resigned to sit as an independent. He was remembered as an outspoken member of parliament unafraid of criticising his own party on issues he felt strongly about.

Early life
Dadour was born in Sydney to Nabeeha (née Zazbeck) and Alexander Elias Dadour, his mother being of Syrian origin. He attended Sydney Boys High School before going to study medicine at the University of Sydney. Towards the end of World War II, he enlisted in the Royal Australian Naval Reserve, serving on HMAS Hobart, HMAS LST 3008, and HMAS Waree before being discharged in November 1946. Dadour moved to Perth in 1953, and eventually opened a doctor's surgery in the suburb of Subiaco (which he maintained throughout his political career). He was elected to the Subiaco City Council in April 1967, and would serve as a councillor until October 1977.

Politics
At the 1971 state election, Dadour was invited to stand for Liberal preselection by the serving premier, Sir David Brand, and subsequently won the seat of Subiaco. He was re-elected at the 1974, 1977, 1980, and 1983 elections. He was a vocal critic of his own governments decision to close the Fremantle to Perth railway in 1979 and presented a 95,000 signature protest petition to parliament. In 1984, he left the Liberal Party after a series of policy disagreements, and sat as an independent until his retirement at the 1986 state election. One of his most notable achievements in parliament was the introduction of a private member's bill restricting tobacco advertising, which was the first of its kind in Australia. It passed the lower house, but was narrowly defeated in the upper house.

Later life
Dadour was made a Member of the Order of Australia (AM) in 2001, and died in Perth in March 2011, aged 85. He had married twice, firstly to Lesley Joan Clarke in 1953, with whom he had four children. He was divorced in 1982 and remarried the same year to Betty Douglas.

References

1925 births
2011 deaths
Australian general practitioners
Australian people of Syrian descent
Independent members of the Parliament of Western Australia
Liberal Party of Australia members of the Parliament of Western Australia
Members of the Western Australian Legislative Assembly
People educated at Sydney Boys High School
Medical doctors from Sydney
University of Sydney alumni
Western Australian local councillors
Politicians from Sydney